Atadoğdu is a village in the Tunceli District, Tunceli Province, Turkey. The village is populated by Kurds of the Ferhadan tribe and had a population of 54 in 2021.

The hamlets of Bozca, Karakoyun and Yukarı Komu are attached to the village.

References 

Villages in Tunceli District
Kurdish settlements in Tunceli Province